2011 Hazara Town shooting refers to a massacre of Hazara people on 6 May 2011 in Hazara Town, Quetta, Pakistan which left 8 dead and at least 15 wounded. The shooting took place early in the morning around 0630 hrs Pakistan Standard Time in a park when people were doing morning-exercises, playing cricket and football. Three rockets were fired which was followed by heavy gunfire. Lashkar-e-Jhangvi (LeJ) claimed responsibility for the attack.

Background
Hazara Town is one of the Hazara populated neighborhoods of southwestern city of Quetta in Pakistani province of Balochistan. The Hazaras are mainly Shia Muslims and their neighborhood is surrounded by other ethnic groups of Sunni sect, Balochs and Pashtuns.

Shooting
The attack took place in an open field park adjacent to Hazara cemetery by Bypass Road. At least 10 armed men with two rocket launchers and automatic assault rifles on three vehicles entered from Brewery Road, took positions on Bypass Road and started shooting. At least three rockets were fired which were followed by heavy gunfire. The shooting last 17 minutes then assailants fled toward the Shalkot area after carrying out the attack. At the end of the day, the shooting left 8 dead and 15 injured.

Perpetrators
The banned Pakistani Sunni extremist militant group Lashkar-e-Jhangvi claimed responsibility for the attacks in Hazara Town. LeJ specifically talks about Hazara Town shooting in one of their night letters distributed in Quetta by LeJ Balochistan Unit. It is believed that it was one of the attacks in revenge of the death of Al-Qaeda leader Osama bin Laden.

Response
The protesters blocked the bypass road and demanded the arrest of the assailants.

The US Embassy in Islamabad also issued a statement condemning the killings: 

The Pakistani political parties Muttahida Qaumi Movement and Tehreek Insaf condemned the killings and demanded the arrest of perpetrators from Government of Pakistan.

See also

2003 Quetta mosque bombing
2004 Quetta Ashura massacre
2011 Mastung bus shooting
Persecution of Hazara people
September 2010 Quetta bombing

References

External links
 Lashkar-e-Jhangvi Night letter talking about May 2011 Hazara Town shooting

2011 murders in Pakistan
2010s crimes in Quetta
2011 mass shootings in Asia
21st-century mass murder in Pakistan
Islamic terrorist incidents in 2011
Lashkar-e-Jhangvi attacks 
Mass murder in 2011
Mass murder in Quetta
Mass shootings in Pakistan
2011 Hazara Town shooting
May 2011 crimes
May 2011 events in Pakistan
Terrorist incidents in Pakistan in 2011
Terrorist incidents in Quetta